Deniz Vural (born 11 July 1988) is a German footballer of Turkish descent who plays for FC Gießen.

References

External links
Deniz Vural at FuPa

Turkish footballers
German footballers
German people of Turkish descent
1988 births
Living people
Süper Lig players
TFF First League players
Altınordu F.K. players
Eintracht Frankfurt II players
Eskişehirspor footballers
Balıkesirspor footballers
Alanyaspor footballers
Denizlispor footballers
Altay S.K. footballers
FC Gießen players
Oberliga (football) players
Association football midfielders
Sportspeople from Giessen
Footballers from Hesse